Johannes Wilhelm Christian Dietrichson (April 4, 1815 – October 15, 1883) was a Norwegian Lutheran minister who played an important role in the initial establishment of the Synod of the Norwegian Evangelical Lutheran Church in America, which eventually became the Evangelical Lutheran Synod.

Personal life
Dietrichson was born in Fredriksstad in Smaalenenes Amt, Norway, as a son of Fredrik Dietrichson (1787–1866) and Karen Sophie Henriette Radich (1794–1867). Through his sister he was an uncle of Johan Scharffenberg, and he was a distant relative of Norwegian politician and labor leader, Wilhelm Dietrichson (1880-1949).

In November 1839 he married Jørgine Laurentze Broch (1816–1841). She was a daughter of  Lieutenant Colonel Johan Jørgen Broch (1791–1860) and a sister of Ole Jacob Broch and Jens Peter Broch. His wife died in childbirth in 1841, and Johannes Dietrichson then married Charlotte Josine Omsen Müller (1819–1903) in June 1846.

Career
He grew up and attended school in Fredriksstad where his teachers includeds Hans Riddervold. He took his examen artium in 1832 and graduated from the Royal Frederick University in Christiania in 1837. He worked in Christiania from 1839, and was present at the Norwegian Missionary Society national convention in 1843. He was ordained a Lutheran minister on February 26, 1844, immigrating to the United States in July that same year.

Dietrichson arrived in Staten Island on July 8, 1844.  After finding little interest in New York in organizing a Lutheran congregation, he continued to Muskego, WI.  He preached his first two sermons at the Wisconsin settlements in Koshkonong Prairie on September 1 and 2, 1844.  The preparatory address for the second service was from Psalm 78:19, "Can God furnish a table in the wilderness?"  This service was held under two oak trees, in which Holy Communion was celebrated. 
Dietrichson organized the settlers into two churches and was called by each church to be their pastor during 1845.

A log church was built on a half acre of land purchased by Dietrichson. The first home to the East Koshkonong Lutheran Church was dedicated on January 31, 1845. After a stay in Norway between 1845 and 1846, during which he married, Dietrichson organized Koshkonong, Luther Valley, and eight other congregations in the state and served as pastor at Koshkonong from 1846 until 1850. He held his post until his return to Norway. At Koshkonong, Dietrichson left in his parish journals and church records of parish membership and ministerial acts, an important written legacy.

Dietrichson experienced a clash of interest with Lutheran laity leader Elling Eielsen. Although seeds of controversy were sown when Dietrichson questioned the validity of clergymen who had been ordained in America, he laid a strong foundation for Norwegian Lutheranism in the United States and encouraged other Lutheran clergymen from Norway to migrate to this country.

Dietrichson returned to Norway in 1850 where he subsequently held two pastorates. He was stationed in Nedstrand from 1850 to 1862 and Østre Moland from 1862 to 1876. This entire period was marked by disagreements with local parishioners. He then served as postmaster at Porsgrund from 1876 until 1882. He was the author of Travels among the Norwegian Emigrants in The United North American Free States (Norwegian: Reise blandt de norske emigranter i “De Forenede nordamerikanske fristater) which was published in Stavanger in 1846. He died in October 1883 in Copenhagen

References

Other sources
A Pioneer Churchman:: J.W.C. Dietrichson in Wisconsin, 1844-1850 (by Johannes Wilhelm Christian Dietrichson. Edited by E. Clifford Nelson. Malcolm Rosholt and Harris E. Kaasa, translators. Published for the Norwegian-American Historical Association by Twayne Publishers. 1973)

1815 births
1883 deaths
University of Oslo alumni
19th-century Norwegian Lutheran clergy
Norwegian expatriates in the United States
People from Fredrikstad